Nicolae Pescaru (27 March 1943 – 25 May 2019) was a Romanian footballer and manager, who worked mostly for Steagul Roșu Brașov.

Club career
Nicolae Pescaru was born on 27 March 1943 in Breaza, Prahova County, Romania. He started to play football at junior level in 1959 at Someșul Beclean, after one year moving at Progresul Făgăraș. He started to play senior football at Chimia Făgăraș in Divizia B, afterwards transferring to Steagul Roșu Brașov where he made his Divizia A debut on 23 September 1962 under coach Silviu Ploeșteanu in a 4–2 home victory against Știința Cluj. He spent a total of 19 seasons at Steagul of which about 13–14 of them he was the team's captain, being known for telling his teammates:"You have to defend the honor of being flagbearers!", the highlights of this period being a fourth place in the 1964–65 Divizia A season and 11 games played in European competitions in which he scored a goal in the 1965–66 Inter-Cities Fairs Cup 4–2 victory against Espanyol Barcelona and played in the 3–2 victory on aggregate against Beşiktaş at the 1974–75 UEFA Cup, also the club relegated twice to Divizia B, but Pescaru stayed with the club, helping it promote back to the first division each time. He played his last Divizia A match on 23 November 1980 in a 3–1 away loss against Progresul București, a competition in which he has a total of 311 appearances with 62 goals scored, thus being Steagul's leader of appearances and goals scored in the competition. He went to play one season for Divizia B team, Șoimii IPA Sibiu, after which he retired  and became a junior coach, also coaching Steagul's senior team in two different periods, having a total of 70 Divizia A matches as coach. Nicolae Pescaru died of cardiorespiratory arrest on 25 May 2019 at age 76.

International career
Nicolae Pescaru played three friendly games at international level for Romania, making his debut under coach Angelo Niculescu, when he came as a substitute and replaced Ion Dumitru at half-time in a 2–0 loss against France. His following two games were a 2–2 against Peru and a 2–0 loss against the Soviet Union. Pescaru was a member of Steagul Roșu Brașov's "Mexican trio", alongside Stere Adamache and Mihai Ivăncescu who were part of Romania's 1970 Mexico World Cup squad, but he did not play in the tournament. For the participation in that tournament he was decorated by President of Romania Traian Băsescu on 25 March 2008 with the Ordinul "Meritul Sportiv" — (The Medal "The Sportive Merit") class III.

Personal life
His father was also a footballer who played at Dinamo Brașov, advising Nicolae, when he was a child that if he should become a footballer, he should play for Steagul Roșu Brașov.

Honours
Steagul Roșu Brașov
Divizia B: 1968–69, 1979–80

Notes

References

External links

Romania National Team 1970-1979 - Details

1943 births
2019 deaths
Romanian footballers
Romania international footballers
1970 FIFA World Cup players
FC Brașov (1936) players
FC Brașov (1936) managers
Liga I players
Liga II players
Association football midfielders
Romanian football managers
People from Breaza